Panoptikum města pražského was a Czechoslovak television programme which was first broadcast in 1986. The programme was written by Jiří Marek and directed by Antonín Moskalyk. It is a sequel to The Sinful People of Prague.

Cast
high police counsel Korejs – Jiří Adamíra
inspector Josef Bouše – Josef Vinklář
inspector Josef Brůžek – Josef Bláha
police koncipist Souček – Ondřej Havelka
detective Václav Mrázek – František Filipovský
police president – Bedřich Prokoš
police medician – Dalimil Klapka

References

External links 
 CSFD.cz - Panoptikum města pražského
 

Czechoslovak television series
1986 Czechoslovak television series debuts
Czech crime television series
Czech drama television series
Czechoslovak Television original programming
Sequel television series
Czech television spin-offs